Leeonzer Barber (born February 18, 1966 in Detroit) was an American professional boxer who held the WBO light-heavyweight title from 1991 to 1994.

Professional career 
Barber turned pro in 1986. In just his 13th fight he won the vacant WBO light-heavyweight title with a TKO win over Tom Collins in Leeds, England in 1991. He defended the title four times before losing the belt by a unanimous decision to Dariusz Michalczewski at Sporthalle, Alsterdorf, Hamburg, Germany in 1994.

His pro record was 21-4 with 13 knockouts.

See also 
 List of WBO world champions
 List of light-heavyweight boxing champions

References

External links 
 

1966 births
Living people
Boxers from Detroit
Light-heavyweight boxers
World Boxing Organization champions
World light-heavyweight boxing champions
American male boxers
African-American boxers
21st-century African-American people
20th-century African-American sportspeople